Grateley is a village and civil parish in the north west of Hampshire, England.

The name is derived from the Old English grēat lēah, meaning 'great wood or clearing'.

The hamlet of Palestine adjoins the railway station settlement, although it is located in the civil parish of Over Wallop.

Grateley lies just to the south of the prehistoric hill fort of Quarley Hill. The village has one pub, a thirteenth-century church dedicated to St Leonard, a primary school, a school for children with Asperger syndrome, a railway station, a small business park, a golf driving range, and is surrounded by farmland with ancient footpaths and droveways.

King Æthelstan issued his first official law code in Grateley in about 930 AD. Recorded in the early 12th century Quadripartitus text, which referred to a ‘great assembly at Grateley’ (magna synodo apud Greateleyam). 
The legestaive assembly and construct of the Grateley law code acted as a manifestation of the peripatetic nature of Anglo-Saxon kingship.

In the 20th century Grateley was one of many ammunition dumps during the World Wars.

The economic history of Grateley is agricultural, but less than 10% of the village population now rely upon agriculture as an occupation.

Notes

External links

Villages in Hampshire